The Lower Saxon Landtag or the Parliament of Lower Saxony is the state diet of the German state of Lower Saxony. It convenes in Hanover and currently consists of 146 members, consisting of four parties. Since 2022 the majority is a coalition of the Social Democratic Party and the Greens, supporting the cabinet of Minister-President Stephan Weil (SPD).

Landtag building

The Landtag is situated in the Leineschloss, a former residence of the kings of Hanover. After its destruction in World War II it was rebuilt from 1957 to 1962. Thus, from 1947 to 1962, the parliament of Lower Saxony convened in the old town hall (Stadthalle Hannover).

Current composition
After the elections of October 9, 2022, the composition of the Lower Saxony Landtag is as follows:

Elections are conducted using a proportional representation system, with a minimum of 5% vote share to receive any seats in the Landtag.

Currently, the Social Democratic Party and the Greens have a government with 81 out of 146 seats (55.5%).

Presidents of the Landtag
So far, the presidents of the Landtag of Lower Saxony have been:
 1946–1955 Karl Olfers, Social Democratic Party (SPD)
 1955–1957 Werner Hofmeister, German Party (DP)/Christian Democratic Union (CDU)
 1957–1959 Paul Oskar Schuster, DP/CDU
 1959–1963 Karl Olfers, SPD
 1963–1967 Richard Lehners, SPD
 1967–1974 Wilhelm Baumgarten, SPD
 1974–1982 Heinz Müller, CDU
 1982–1985 Bruno Brandes, CDU
 1985–1990 Edzard Blanke, CDU
 1990–1998 Horst Milde, SPD
 1998–2003 Rolf Wernstedt, SPD
 2003–2008 Jürgen Gansäuer, CDU
 2008–2013 Hermann Dinkla, CDU
 2013–2017 Bernd Busemann, CDU
 2017–2022 Gabriele Andretta, SPD
 2022 Hanna Naber, SPD

See also
 1998 Lower Saxony state election
 2003 Lower Saxony state election
 2008 Lower Saxony state election
 2013 Lower Saxony state election
 2017 Lower Saxony state election
 2022 Lower Saxony state election

References

External links

 Official english Webpage of the Landtag

Lower Saxony
Landtag of Lower Saxony
Unicameral legislatures